Frank Tavani (born July 31, 1953) is a former American football coach.  He served as the head football coach at Lafayette College from 2000 until his retirement in 2016, compiling a record of 84–107.

Head coaching record

References

1953 births
Living people
American football running backs
Franklin & Marshall Diplomats football coaches
Lafayette Leopards football coaches
Lebanon Valley Flying Dutchmen football coaches
Lebanon Valley Flying Dutchmen football players